The following is a list of directors who have worked on the Fox animated television series The Simpsons in the order of first credited episode (by broadcast). As of March 19, 2023, 40 people have been credited with directing or co-directing at least one episode of The Simpsons.

List of directors

See also

References

External links
Snpp.com: The Simpsons Archive

Directors
Simpsons
.The Simpsons